National Restoration (RN) was a Peruvian Christian evangelicalist political party.

History 
In 2016, National Restoration once again allied with Alliance for Progress and the two formed the Alliance for the Progress of Peru and presented Cesar Acuña as their presidential candidate with Humberto Lay  as its candidate for First Vice President, however on 9 March the National Elections Jury barred Acuña from participating in the general election for violating the Political Parties Law.

Dissolution  
In mid-2019, Lay resigned from the leadership of National Restoration, the party underwent a formal reorganization that involved a re-foundation with a name-change. After multiple talks with different political leaders, the party reached an agreement with former footballer George Forsyth in order to reorganize the party.

In October 2020, the party announced its re-foundation under Forsyth's leadership, thus effectively dissolving National Restoration, and establishing National Victory.

Election results

Presidential election

Elections to the Congress of the Republic

Regional and municipal elections

References

External links
Official website (Spanish)
 

Conservative parties in Peru
Christian democratic parties in South America
Protestant political parties
Protestantism in Peru
Political parties established in 2005
Political parties disestablished in 2020